T. Rex is a 1970 album by Marc Bolan's band T. Rex, the first under that name and the fifth since their debut as Tyrannosaurus Rex in 1968.  It was released on 18 December by record labels Fly and Reprise. The album continued the shift begun by its predecessor from the band's previous folk style to a minimal rock sound, and was still a balance of electric and acoustic material.

Content and music 
Although the album was credited to T. Rex, all the recordings (as well as the cover shot) were done when they still were Tyrannosaurus Rex, with the two-man lineup of singer/songwriter/guitarist Marc Bolan and percussionist Mickey Finn, although producer Tony Visconti played bass and recorder on a couple of tracks. Bolan had considered calling the album The Wizard or The Children of Rarn, before opting for a self-titled album.  Bolan wanted to be pictured with his electric guitar to suit the new electric image he was trying to create. 

The album continued in the vein of the duo's previous album A Beard of Stars, with an even further emphasis on an electric rock sound and the addition of strings on several tracks. Certain tracks like "The Time of Love is Now", "Suneye" and "Root of Star", were stylistically closer to the folk music of Tyrannosaurus Rex. 
AllMusic wrote that "The tone of the album is a bit more pastoral" than on the previous album but electric guitars are integrated in tracks in "Beltane Walk"," "Is It Love", and "Diamond Meadows", predating the style of the follow-up. Lyrics were inspired in part by Tolkien. It is poetry about wizards, Druids, and a "Liquid Poetess in a buckskin dress". Journalist Tom Everett observed that Bolan was "clearly infatuated with mysticism, as well as the pure sounds of the English language".

The album contained electric reworkings of two old Tyrannosaurus Rex songs, one of which, "The Wizard", was originally recorded as the A side of Bolan's (solo) first single, back in 1965. The second was an electric version of the second Tyrannosaurus Rex single, "One Inch Rock", with an intro of scat-singing by Bolan and Finn, which the duo had been incorporating into live acoustic versions for some months prior to the album sessions. The remaining short songs, however, were new material. The opener and closing track were incursion into symphonic rock. 

Howard Kaylan and Mark Volman, aka "Flo and Eddie", sang backup vocals for the first time on a T. Rex song, "Seagull Woman". They would go on to sing on most of the group's subsequent string of hits.

Release 
The album was released on 18 December 1970 by Fly and Reprise. The sleeve design was unusual, requiring a sideways look to unfold the cover, or to have the artwork sideways to remove the LP.

It broke T. Rex in the UK, following the surprise success of the then-recent single "Ride a White Swan", which reached No. 2 in the charts, and before its No. 1 follow-up "Hot Love". The album is today listed by the Official Chart Company's website as having eventually reached a chart peak of No. 7 and accumulated several runs on the charts totalling 25 weeks. This peak however took place during the 1971 United Kingdom postal workers strike during which no album chart was issued and therefore the site recognises the Melody Maker chart for February–April 1971.   The Guinness Book of British Hit Albums which did not recognise any album chart for the missing weeks, listed the album as having peaked at number 13.

The US pressing of the LP concluded with "Ride a White Swan", rather than "The Children of Rarn (Reprise)".

Reception and legacy

Upon release, Rolling Stone published a glowing review saying, "It's difficult to isolate any one or two songs as being special favorites". Reviewer Todd Everett praised the band for "their ability to intermix vocal and instrumental sounds — the voices often go into a feedback guitar imitation. It's not the kind of trick every group should try".

In his retrospective review, Mark Deming of AllMusic wrote, "T. Rex is the quiet before the storm of Electric Warrior, and it retains a loopy energy and easy charm that makes it one of Bolan's watershed works".

Richard Barone of the Bongos covered "The Visit" on his first solo album, Cool Blue Halo (1987). Siouxsie Sioux covered "Jewel" in 1999 with her second band the Creatures.

Track listing

Personnel 
T.Rex
 Marc Bolan – vocals, guitar, bass, organ
 Mickey Finn – drums, bass, Pixiphone, vocals
with:
 Tony Visconti – bass, piano, recorder, string arrangements, production
 Howard Kaylan – backing vocals
 Mark Volman – backing vocals
 Roy Thomas Baker – engineering

Charts

References

External links 
 

T. Rex (band) albums
1970 albums
Albums arranged by Tony Visconti
Albums produced by Tony Visconti
Albums recorded at Trident Studios
Fly Records albums
Reprise Records albums